Linlithgow and East Falkirk is a county constituency of the House of Commons of the Parliament of the United Kingdom, created for use in the 2005 general election. It replaced most of Falkirk East and Linlithgow.

The constituency covers the eastern portion of the Falkirk council area and the western portion of the West Lothian council area.

Boundaries 

The constituency was formed for the 2005 United Kingdom general election. It comprises communities from West Lothian and Falkirk council areas. These comprise Armadale, Avonbridge, Bathgate, Blackness, Blackridge, Boghall, Bo'ness, California, Grangemouth, Greenrigg, Linlithgow, Maddiston, Philpstoun, Reddingmuirhead, Rumford, Slamannan, Torphichen, Wallacestone, Westfield, Whitburn and Whitecross.

Members of Parliament

Election results

Elections of the 2010s

Elections of the 2000s

References 

Westminster Parliamentary constituencies in Scotland
Constituencies of the Parliament of the United Kingdom established in 2005
Politics of Falkirk (council area)
Politics of West Lothian
Grangemouth
Linlithgow